This is a list of law enforcement agencies in the state of Wyoming.

According to the US Bureau of Justice Statistics' 2008 Census of State and Local Law Enforcement Agencies, the state had 90 law enforcement agencies employing 1,691 sworn police officers, about 317 for each 100,000 residents.

State agencies 
 Wyoming Department of Transportation
 Wyoming Highway Patrol
 Wyoming Department of Corrections
 Wyoming State Attorney General's Office
 Division of Criminal Investigation
 Wyoming Game and Fish Department
 Game Wardens
 Wyoming State Parks, Historical Sites, and Trails
 Park Rangers
 Wyoming Department of Fire Prevention and Electrical Safety (State Fire Marshal)
 Fire Investigation
 Wyoming Livestock Board
 Law Enforcement
 Wyoming Gaming Commission (Employs two sworn investigators)
 Wyoming State Board of Outfitters and Professional Guides (Employs one sworn investigator)
 Wyoming Supreme Court (Employs one sworn bailiff)

County agencies 

 Albany County Sheriff's Office
 Big Horn County Sheriff's Office
 Campbell County Sheriff's Office
 Carbon County Sheriff's Office
 Converse County Sheriff's Office
 Crook County Sheriff's Office
 Fremont County Sheriff's Office
 Goshen County Sheriff's Office

 Hot Springs County Sheriff's Office
 Johnson County Sheriff's Office
 Laramie County Sheriff's Office
 Lincoln County Sheriff's Office
 Natrona County Sheriff's Office
 Niobrara County Sheriff's Office
 Park County Sheriff's Office
 Platte County Sheriff's Office

 Sheridan County Sheriff's Office
 Sublette County Sheriff's Office
 Sweetwater County Sheriff's Office
 Teton County Sheriff's Office
 Uinta County Sheriff's Office
 Washakie County Sheriff's Office
 Weston County Sheriff's Office

Municipal agencies 

 Afton Police Department
 Bairoil Police Department
 Basin Police Department
 Buffalo Police Department
 Casper Police Department
 Cheyenne Police Department
 Cody Police Department
 Cokeville Police Department
 Diamondville Police Department
 Douglas Police Department
 Encampment Police Department
 Evanston Police Department
 Evansville Police Department
 Frannie Police Department
 Gillette Police Department
 Glenrock Police Department
 Green River Police Department

 Greybull Police Department
 Guernsey Police Department
 Hanna Marshal's Office
 Hulett Police Department
 Jackson Police Department
 Kemmerer Police Department
 Lander Police Department
 Laramie Police Department
 Lingle Police Department
 Lovell Police Department
 Lusk Police Department
 Lyman Police Department
 Medicine Bow Marshal's Office
 Midwest Police Department
 Mills Police Department
 Moorcroft Police Department
 Mountain View Police Department

 Newcastle Police Department
 Pine Bluffs Police Department
 Powell Police Department
 Rawlins Police Department
 Riverton Police Department
 Rock Springs Police Department
 Saratoga Police Department
 Sheridan Police Department
 Shoshoni Police Department
 Sinclair Police Department
 Sundance Police Department
 Thayne Police Department
 Thermopolis Police Department
 Torrington Police Department
 Upton Police Department
 Wheatland Police Department
 Worland Police Department

College and University agencies 
 University of Wyoming Police Department

References

Wyoming
Law enforcement agencies
Law enforcement agencies of Wyoming